The Zamorin's Guruvayurappan College is an aided college in Kozhikode, Kerala, India offering graduation and post-graduation courses. It is affiliated to the University of Calicut.

History 
The original institution was founded by the Zamorin of Eranad, HH Shri. Manavikraman Maharaja Bahadur, as an English school in June 1877, to impart English education to the young members of the Zamorin's family. In 1878, it came to be known as "Kerala Vidyasala" and was thrown open to Hindu boys of all castes.

In 1879, the institution was affiliated to the University of Madras as a second grade college. In 1900, the institution was renamed "The Zamorin's College". In 1904, the Zamorin constituted a Board of Management for the administration of the college. The present site of the college at Pokkunnu was purchased with the help of a grant from the Guruvayur Devaswom.

In recognition of this gift, the institution was renamed "The Guruvayurappan College". In 1955, the college moved to its present site, at Pokkunnu. In 1958, the college was affiliated to the University of Travancore, which later came to be known as the University of Kerala. Later in 1968, when the University of Calicut was formed, the college was affiliated to it.

The college acquired its present name "The Zamorin's Guruvayurappan College" in 1981.

Courses offered 
The college offers 3 year undergraduate degree programs in 12 different specializations as well as 2 year post graduate programs in 9 specializations. PhD is offered in Botany, Economics, Malayalam, Chemistry and English. The college also has a computer center which offers vocational training to students and conducts Diploma course in computer applications.

Facilities
Zamorins Guruvayurappan college is one of the oldest institution in the country celebrating its 144th anniversary in 2021. The college campus is located on top of the hill called Pokkunnu, also called Krishna Giri hills, 8 km away from the city of Calicut. The campus of the college spans over an area of 92 acres.

Academic
 16 fully fledged departments
 Seminar hall
 Botanic garden
 Herbal garden
 Yoga hall
 Informatics lab
 Research centre
 Career guidance centre

Co-curricular
 Open-air stages – Chaitram and Kailasam
 Health and trauma care centre

Extracurricular
 Big play ground for football, cricket and hockey
 Pavilion with changing rooms
 Basketball, tennis ball and volleyball courts

Alumni 

John Matthai, former Finance Minister, Government of India
 Justice V. Balakrishna Eradi
 V. K. Krishna Menon, nationalist, politician and diplomat; Former Union minister for Defense
 S. K. Pottekkatt, Malayalam author
 M. P. M. Menon, Diplomat
 K. P. Kesava Menon, nationalist and politician; Founder of the Malayalam newspaper, Mathrubhumi
 A. Pradeepkumar, communist politician; former MLA Kozhikode North constituency
 N. P. Mohammed, Novelist 
 K. K. Rema, MLA
 Joy Mathew, film director and activist
 Anil Radhakrishnan Menon, film director
 Vinod Kovoor, cine artist
 P. Vijayan IPS
 U. K. Kumaran
 Ranjith Padinhateeri, 
 M N Karassery
 K. Damodaran, Communist Writer

See also

References

External links
 The Zamorin's Guruvayurappan College
 NAAC accreditation for Zamorin's College, The Hindu, 22 May 2004

Colleges affiliated with the University of Calicut
Arts and Science colleges in Kerala
Universities and colleges in Kozhikode
Educational institutions established in 1877
1877 establishments in India
Academic institutions formerly affiliated with the University of Madras